Majhigawan  is a village, located in Rohtas District, Bihar on the fertile Gangetic Plain. It has a picturesque and beautiful setting, being located between the Sone River and the Kaimur Range of mountains, on which there is lush tropical forest.

Majhigawan is a famous village within the region and across Bihar, due to the Mishra family. The majority of people in the village are Brahmins of Ghrit Kaushik Mishra gotra, and are descended from Shri. Tara Mishra, alongside Brahmins there are Dusadhs, Koiris, Dombas and Chamars. The majority of the population is Hindu and there are numerous Mandirs, where the Hindu people of Majhgawan come to worship. There are a small minority of Muslims in the village. There is a Shiv Mandir and a Hanuman Mandir, as well as a Devi Mandir.

The majority of the population are engaged in agriculture, with a vast array of crops being grown, through the latest techniques. Rice, Wheat, Lentils, Sugarcane and Mangoes are only a few of the crops being grown, with the village being self-sufficient in everything, with the exception of salt and clothes. 

Villages in Rohtas district